Henderson Valley is a locality in West Auckland, New Zealand. The major road in the locality is Henderson Valley Road, and Scenic Drive is on the western boundary.

History
The Henderson Valley is in the traditional rohe of Te Kawerau ā Maki, and was traditionally known as Ōpanuku. Ōpanuku refers to one of the oldest Te Kawerau ā Maki ancestors, Panuku, the wife of Parekura who died after being kidnapped by a warrior named Nihotupu. Te Kawerau ā Maki had a settlement along the Opanuku Stream known as Ōpareira. The name refers to Pareira, the niece of early ancestor and voyager Toi-te-huatahi. Pareira lived at Te Wai-o-Pareira / Henderson Creek and would seasonally inhabit the Henderson Valley, harvesting the resources of the forest.

The Opanuku Stream which flows down the valley was one of the earliest waterways to be dammed for kauri logging in West Auckland, in the 1850s. The valley was settled by pākehā by the 1880s, with Henderson Valley Road providing access.

In the 1920s, the Henderson Valley Scenic Reserve/Carey Park was a popular picnic and swimming area known as Ferndale, where the Brown Owl Tea Rooms was located.

Demographics

Henderson Valley had a population of 1,440 at the 2018 New Zealand census, an increase of 87 people (6.4%) since the 2013 census, and an increase of 99 people (7.4%) since the 2006 census. There were 486 households, comprising 729 males and 711 females, giving a sex ratio of 1.03 males per female. The median age was 40.2 years (compared with 37.4 years nationally), with 279 people (19.4%) aged under 15 years, 267 (18.5%) aged 15 to 29, 723 (50.2%) aged 30 to 64, and 165 (11.5%) aged 65 or older.

Ethnicities were 89.0% European/Pākehā, 13.3% Māori, 5.0% Pacific peoples, 6.0% Asian, and 1.7% other ethnicities. People may identify with more than one ethnicity.

The percentage of people born overseas was 23.3, compared with 27.1% nationally.

Although some people chose not to answer the census's question about religious affiliation, 62.7% had no religion, 26.7% were Christian, 0.6% had Māori religious beliefs, 0.4% were Hindu, 0.6% were Buddhist and 2.1% had other religions.

Of those at least 15 years old, 279 (24.0%) people had a bachelor's or higher degree, and 129 (11.1%) people had no formal qualifications. The median income was $41,900, compared with $31,800 nationally. 306 people (26.4%) earned over $70,000 compared to 17.2% nationally. The employment status of those at least 15 was that 669 (57.6%) people were employed full-time, 183 (15.8%) were part-time, and 33 (2.8%) were unemployed.

Education
Henderson Valley School is a coeducational contributing primary (years 1-6) school with a roll of  students as of  The school opened in 1915.

Notes

Populated places in the Auckland Region
Waitākere Ranges Local Board Area
Waitākere Ranges
West Auckland, New Zealand